The B4 lens mount was standardized in 1992 by the Broadcasting Technology Association (BTA) and is defined in BTA S-1005. This standard defines the physical mount, but also optical properties and some electrical connections. The B4 mount defines the sensor to have a diagonal size of 11 mm (a so-called 2/3" size sensor). The B4-mount is used by practically all 2/3" broadcast lenses and cameras (as of 2019).

Although the standard was set in 1992, the B4 mount already existed before 1980. The Sony BVP-300, produced from 1978, was possibly the first camera with a B4 mount. Further, all Sony Betacam cameras had a B4 mount.

The BTA was formed by Japanese broadcaster NHK and included members from Canon, Fuji, Hitachi, Ikegami, JVC, Matsushita (Panasonic), Nikon, Sony and Toshiba. It was formed in the mid 1980s and set various standards for television. It is now part of ARIB, Association of Radio Industries and Businesses.

Mechanical 

The flange of the mount defines the positioning of the lens relative to the image sensor. A ring is present around the opening on the camera which, when rotated, tightly locks the flange of the lens against the camera. A pin on the top side of the lens flange and a hole in the camera mount make sure the lens cannot be mounted at an angle.

Optical 

The B4-mount has its image projected at 48 mm behind the lens mount flange (in air). The standard defines that a prism splits the light to form separate images planes for the colours red, green and blue. A correction for chromatic aberration is also part of the standard: the red sensor should be 10 μm further, and the blue one 5 μm further than 48 mm. This fitted well with established TV-camera technology using 3 tubes, and also with 3CCD, a technology in development at the time of the definition of the standard.

The standard defines that the diagonal size of the projected image should be 11 mm, but does not define a resolution to be used. In the past standard definition was captured at 4:3 aspect ratio. Nowadays, cameras with the same mount capture HD with 16:9 aspect ratio, or even 4K video, thanks to improved lenses.

Electrical 

The lens mount is accompanied by a connector for the electrical connections. It powers the lens motors, controls the iris and allows a few buttons on the lens handle to control camera functions. The connectors are made by Hirose. On the camera is a HR10-10R-12S receptacle, and on the lens a cable with a HR10-10P-12P plug.

References 

Digital photography